Ritchie Bayly (born 1 April 1962) is an Irish former soccer player.

He made his debut for Shamrock Rovers on 22 October 1978 .

He also played in a UEFA Cup Winners' Cup tie against Banik Ostrava at Milltown 1 November 1978 
At sixteen years of age Ritchie became the youngest player ever to play for the Hoops in a European tie.

He controversially transferred to Drogheda United in February 1983 

He played with his brother Martin Bayly at Sligo and his nephew Robert Bayly currently plays for Shelbourne.

Sources 
 The Hoops by Paul Doolan and Robert Goggins

Shamrock Rovers F.C. players
Republic of Ireland under-21 international footballers
Republic of Ireland association footballers
League of Ireland players
Drogheda United F.C. players
Sligo Rovers F.C. players
Bohemian F.C. players
Kilkenny City A.F.C. players
League of Ireland managers
Living people
1962 births
St James's Gate F.C. players
St James's Gate F.C. managers
Monaghan United F.C. players
Association footballers from County Dublin
Association football midfielders
Republic of Ireland football managers